Austrobalanus imperator is a species of symmetrical sessile barnacle in the family Austrobalanidae.

Subspecies
These subspecies belong to the species Austrobalanus imperator:
 Austrobalanus imperator aotea Buckeridge, 1983
 Austrobalanus imperator imperator (Darwin, 1854)

References

External links

 

Austrobalanidae

Crustaceans described in 1854